In Brazil, a driver's licence (officially named Carteira Nacional de Habilitação in Portuguese, shortened as CNH and translated as "National Qualification Card") is required in order to drive cars, buses, trucks and motorcycles. Current CNHs can be used as identity cards in all the national territory.

It was formerly called PGU, but in 2008 CONTRAN (Conselho Nacional de Trânsito, translated as "National Traffic Council") overhauled the system, requiring all driver's holders to re-register, so they could be grouped in Renach (Registro Nacional de Condutores Habilitados, National Register of Qualified Drivers).

Minors, the illiterate and people without an ID card are not allowed to have a CNH.

Required training
Until 2008, 20 hours of theory classes and 15 hours of practical classes were required in order to obtain a CNH. However, from 2009 on, a total of 45 hours of theory classes are required for all categories, these classes now covering the previously optional subjects such as Brazilian traffic law, defensive driving and first aid. After attending the classes, students are subjected to a 30-question test, and are approved if providing at least 21 correct answers. Finally, at least 25 hours of practical lessons must be taken plus more 4 hours of night lessons, and 5 hours in a car simulator, accompanied by an instructor from a certified driving school.

Infractions
When a vehicle is spotted (either by a traffic agent, the police or an automated system such as a speed camera) violating traffic regulations, its owner receives a notification by post, including details of the violation: type; location; the penalty fine; and proof, if available, like pictures taken by speed cameras. Fifteen days after this notification is received, the actual ticket is issued. During these 15 days, the owner can submit a form to inform the traffic authority if they weren't the one driving the car when the offence was committed. For example, if Marcos lends his car to Paulo, and Paulo commits a traffic offence, Marcos will receive the notification. He then fills the form with Paulo's  information, has Paulo sign it and submit it to the traffic authority within the 15 days. Then all fines and other sanctions for that violation will be issued to Paulo instead of Marcos.

Traffic violations in Brazil issue points against the driver's license. Offences are divided in four categories: "minor" (3 points), "medium" (4 points), "serious" (5 points) and "very serious" (7 points). The points for a traffic violation last for one year, starting at the day of the offence.
 
If at any time the total score passes 20 points (which means the driver has obtained more than 20 points within one year), the license will be suspended and the local traffic authority will notify the driver, who can enter a defense within the next sixty days. In after the 60 days the traffic authority will decide the duration of the suspension, which can vary from 1 to 24 months. Once the suspension period ends and the driver completes an "offender driver reeducation course", the suspension is terminated.

Temporary CNH
Also called PPD ("Permissão Para Dirigir" translated as "Permission To Drive"). The first driving licence is a 1-year permit. It is basically the same as a fully-fledged licence, but with some particularities regarding infractions and penalties. The permit may be revoked (instead of only suspended) in the case of committing any "very serious" or "serious" infraction, or two "medium" infractions. The 20 points system remains the same. Having the CNH permit revoked means the driver must restart the entire process to acquire a new CNH permit.

Expiration Date
The Brazilian driving licence is valid for 30 days after the expiration date. It means one may still drive for 30 days using the expired licence.

Categories
CNHs are divided in five categories, according to the vehicles the driver is allowed to drive:

 Category A – Two or three-wheeled motor vehicles, with or without a sidecar. This category is for motorcycle drivers.
 Category B – Any motor vehicle not in category A that weights up to 3,500 kg (~7,700 lb), can carry at most 8 people besides the driver, and has no articulation or trailer. This category is for all common cars up to vans, although in the latter, the passenger-carrying capacity has to be considered. Note that the law limits the capacity of the vehicle, not the actual number of passengers, so a driver with a category B  can not drive a van with more than 8 seats (9 with the driver's) even if none of the other seats are occupied. Traffic regulations forbid more than one passenger per seat and requires all passengers to be seated, except for buses, so this is a de facto limit on passengers too, although this regulation is rarely enforced.
 Category C – Same as category B, but without the weight limit. This category allows all vehicles in category B, in addition to rigid trucks.
 Category D – Same as category C, but without the passenger limit. This category allows all vehicles in category C, in addition to rigid buses (thus allowing all vehicles except motorcycles, semi trucks and articulated buses).
 Category E – Same as category D, but also allowing trailers (including semi trucks) and articulated buses. This category allows all street-legal vehicles with four wheels or more.

The requirements for each category are as follows:

 Categories A and B - The applicant must be at least 18 years old, be able to read and write (although not necessarily with proficiency) and have an ID card, in addition to being approved in physical and psychological examinations.
 Category C - The applicant must have a CNH of category B for at least a year.
 Category D - The applicant must be at least 21 years old and have a CNH of category B for at least two years or of category C for at least a year.
 Category E - The applicant must be at least 21 years old and have a CNH of category C or D for at least a year.

Additional requirements

Some types of vehicles or uses require additional training. The additional courses are:

 Emergency vehicles course - Required to drive emergency vehicles like ambulances or police cars.
 Public passenger transport course - Required to drive vehicles used in public transport, like urban public buses. Requires a CNH category D.
 School vehicles course - Required to drive vehicles used to transport students, such as school buses. Requires a CNH category D.
 Transportation of hazardous products course - Required to drive vehicles transporting hazardous materials, such as flammable, explosive, corrosive or radioactive substances, as well as substances that release hazardous materials when exposed to water, substances that can self-ignite, and any kind of poisonous substance. Requires a CNH category C.

The driver is not allowed to sign up for any of these courses if they committed a serious or very serious or more than one medium offence less than a year before or if their CNH is suspended.

Future

New Driving licence with chip

The Brazilian National Driving Licence will change from a paper format to a plastic card with a microchip, containing information on the driver.

A resolution of the National Traffic Council (Contran) said that the change would become effective on 1 January 2019.

The resource will facilitate supervision and will allow the provision of services: such as road user toll payment, public transportation and biometric identification according to the Ministry of Cities.

The new document should increase durability, reduce fraud and enable integration with other countries.

See also 
 Vehicle Restriction in São Paulo

References

External links
 DENATRAN official website
 Driving in Brazil for foreigners

Brazil
Brazil